Where The Fuck Is Revolution? was the fourth album by Canadian punk rock band Closet Monster, released in 2000.

Track listing

"Right From Birth"
"Lockdown"
"Class Oppression 101"
"Dearest Asshole"
"Freedom Is Slavery"

2000 albums
Closet Monster albums